An industrial park (also known as industrial estate, trading estate) is an area zoned and planned for the purpose of industrial development. An industrial park can be thought of as a more "heavyweight" version of a business park or office park, which has offices and light industry, rather than heavy industry. Industrial parks are notable for being relatively simple to build; they often feature speedily erected single-space steel sheds, occasionally in bright colours.

Benefits 
 

Industrial parks are usually located on the edges of, or outside, the main residential area of a city, and are normally provided with good transportation access, including road and rail. One such example is the large number of industrial estates located along the River Thames in the Thames Gateway area of London. Industrial parks are usually located close to transport facilities, especially where more than one transport modes coincide, including highways, railroads, airports and ports. Another common feature of a North American industrial park is a water tower, which helps to hold enough water to meet the park's demands and for firefighting purposes, and also advertises the industrial park and locality, as usually the community's name and logo are painted onto its surface.

This idea of setting land aside through this type of zoning has several purposes:
 By concentrating dedicated infrastructure in a delimited area, to reduce the per-business cost of that infrastructure. Such infrastructure includes roadways, railroad sidings, ports, high-power electric supplies (often including three-phase electric power), high-end communications cables, large-volume water supplies, and high-volume gas lines.
 To attract new business by providing an integrated infrastructure in one location.
 Eligibility of Industrial Parks for benefits.
 To set apart industrial uses from urban areas to try to reduce the environmental and social impact of the industrial uses.
 To provide for localized environmental controls that are specific to the needs of an industrial area.

Benchmarking 
For the manufacturing companies located in industrial parks, the performance of industrial park operators is important, as the costs for infrastructure and services charged by the industrial park operator is a serious factor for the competitiveness of the manufacturing companies.

Criticism 
Different industrial parks fulfill these criteria to differing degrees. Many small communities have established industrial parks with only access to a nearby highway, and with only the basic utilities and roadways. Public transportation options may be limited or non-existent.

Industrial parks in developing countries such as Pakistan face a myriad of additional difficulties. This includes the availability of a skilled workforce and the clustering together of radically different industrial sectors (pharmaceuticals and heavy engineering, for example), which often leads to unfavorable outcomes for quality centered industries.

Variations 
An industrial park specializing in biotechnology is called a biotechnology industrial park. It may also be known as a bio-industrial park or eco-industrial cluster.

Flatted factories exist in cities like Singapore and Hong Kong, where land is scarce. These are typically similar to flats, but house individual industries instead. Flatted factories have cargo lifts and roads that serve each level, providing access to each factory lot.

Countries

India 
India was one of the first countries in Asia to recognize the effectiveness of the Export Processing Zone (EPZ) model in promoting exports, with Asia's first EPZ set up in Kandla in 1965. In order to overcome the shortcomings experienced on account of the multiplicity of controls and clearances; absence of world-class infrastructure, and an unstable fiscal regime and with a view to attract larger foreign investments in India, the Special Economic Zones (SEZs) Policy was announced in April 2000.A special economic zone (SEZ) is a geographical region that has economic laws that are more liberal than a country's domestic economic laws. India has specific laws for its SEZs.The category 'SEZ' covers a broad range of more specific zone types, including free-trade zones (FTZ), export processing zones (EPZ), free zones (FZ), industrial estates (IE), free ports, urban enterprise zones and others. Usually, the goal of a structure is to increase foreign direct investment by foreign investors, typically an international business or a Multi National Corporation (MNC).

Notable SEZs in India

 DGDC SEZ, Surat (SURSEZ)
 Dholera SEZ, Gujarat
 Divi's Laboratories Limited Chippada Village, Visakhapatnam, Andhra Pradesh Pharmaceuticals
 DLF Cyber City, Gurgaon Gurgaon, Haryana IT/ITES
 HCL ELCOT SEZ – Sholingnalur, Chennai
 HCL IT city, Lucknow, Uttar Pradesh IT & Start-Up
 Infosys Technologies SEZ Mangaluru Bengaluru, Karnataka IT/ITES
 Jindal Steel and Power, Choudwar
 Kandla SEZ, Gandhidham, Gujarat{KASEZ}
 POSCO India SEZ, Paradeep
 Mundra Port & Special Economic Zone, Multi Product
 Maharashtra Industrial Development Corporation Ltd., Pune - IT/ITES
 Reliance Jamnagar Infrastructure Ltd. Jamnagar Multi Product
 Zydus Infrastructure Pvt. Ltd. Sanand, Ahmedabad Pharmaceutical
 Larsen & Toubro Limited's IT/ ITeS SEZ at Surat, Gujarat
 Calica Group's "3rd eye voice" IT/ITES SEZ, Ahmedabad
 Gallops Engineering SEZ, Moraiyya, Near Changodar, Ahmedabad
 Vatva Ahmedabad
 Infocity IT Park, IT/ITES, Gandhinagar, Gujarat
 GIFT SEZ, GIFT CITY, Gandhinagar, Gujarat
 DAHEJ SEZ 1 and 2, Tal Vagra, Bharuch
 TCS Garima Park IT/ITES SEZ, Gandhinagar
 WIPRO Limited Doddakannelli Village, Varthur Hobli, Electronic City, Bengaluru IT

Turkey 
An organized industrial zone is a kind of special economic zone in Turkey. These zones were legislated for between 2000 and 2007, and may bring together related (OIZs for function) industries or just be a special zone for many industries (mixed OIZs).
Not every industry is allowed to operate in organized industrial zones. Organized industrial zones are not duty-free, but there are considerable tax and location(by making related industries closer) advantages. OIZs are related to industrial parks in some countries.

References

External links

See also 
 Energy park
 Industrial district
 Mill town
 Industrial railway
 Cyberpark
 Free trade zone

 
Industrial Park
Turkish industries